This article provides information on candidates who stood for the 1903 Australian federal election. The election was held on 16 December 1903.

By-elections, appointments and defections

By-elections and appointments
On 14 September 1901, Littleton Groom (Protectionist) was elected to replace William Henry Groom (Protectionist) as the member for Darling Downs.
On 26 March 1902, William Hartnoll (Free Trade) was elected to replace Frederick Piesse (Free Trade) as one of the five members for Tasmania.
On 21 January 1903, Robert Reid (Free Trade) was appointed as a Victorian Senator to replace Sir Frederick Sargood (Free Trade).
On 20 May 1903, Henry Saunders (Free Trade) was appointed as a Western Australian Senator to replace Norman Ewing (Free Trade).
On 4 September 1903, George Reid (Free Trade) won the seat of East Sydney, which he had re-contested to assert his leadership.
On 8 October 1903, Charles Mackellar (Protectionist) was appointed as a New South Wales Senator to replace Richard O'Connor (Protectionist).

Defections
In 1902, Free Trade MP Alexander Poynton (Grey) joined the Labour Party.
South Australian Free Trade MP Sir Frederick Holder had resigned from the party by the 1903 election after being elected Speaker of the House of Representatives in 1901. He contested the election as an Independent, but was unopposed by the other parties.
Queensland Protectionist MP Thomas Macdonald-Paterson (Brisbane) lost pre-selection and contested the election as an Independent.
Tasmanian Free Trade Senator Henry Dobson contested the election as a member of the Tariff Reform Party.
Queensland Protectionist Senator Thomas Glassey lost pre-selection, and contested the election as an Independent.

Redistributions and seat changes

South Australia and Tasmania, which for the first federal election were contested as single electorates for the House of Representatives:
South Australia was divided into seven electorates: Adelaide, Angas, Barker, Boothby, Grey, Hindmarsh and Wakefield. Of the seven members elected for the division of South Australia in 1901, Charles Kingston (Protectionist) contested Adelaide, Paddy Glynn (Free Trade) contested Angas, Sir Langdon Bonython (Protectionist) contested Barker, Lee Batchelor (Labour) and Vaiben Louis Solomon (Free Trade) contested Boothby, Alexander Poynton (Labour) contested Grey, Sir Frederick Holder (the Speaker) contested Wakefield, and no sitting members contested Hindmarsh.
Tasmania was divided into five electorates: Bass, Darwin, Denison, Franklin and Wilmot. Of the five members elected for the division of Tasmania in 1901, William Hartnoll (Free Trade) contested Bass, King O'Malley (Labour) contested Darwin, Sir Philip Fysh (Protectionist) and Norman Cameron (Free Trade) contested Denison, Sir Edward Braddon (Free Trade) contested Wilmot, and no sitting members contested Franklin.
The Free Trade MP for Lang, Francis McLean, contested Hume.

Retiring Members and Senators

Protectionist
 Sir Edmund Barton MP (Hunter, NSW)
 George Cruickshank MP (Gwydir, NSW)
 Chester Manifold MP (Corangamite, Vic)
Senator Sir John Downer (SA)
Senator Charles Mackellar (NSW)

Free Trade
 Samuel Cooke MP (Wannon, Vic)
 Arthur Groom MP (Flinders, Vic)
 Sir William McMillan MP (Wentworth, NSW)
Senator John Ferguson (Qld) — seat declared vacant prior to election due to lack of attendance
Senator Edward Harney (WA)
Senator Robert Reid (Vic)

Independent
 Alexander Paterson MP (Capricornia, Qld)

House of Representatives
Sitting members at the time of the election are shown in bold text.
Successful candidates are highlighted in the relevant colour. Where there is possible confusion, an asterisk (*) is also used.

New South Wales

Queensland

South Australia

Tasmania

Victoria

Western Australia

Senate
Sitting Senators are listed in bold.
Tickets that elected at least one Senator are highlighted in the relevant colour. Successful candidates are identified by an asterisk (*).

New South Wales
Three seats were up for election. The Protectionist Party was defending one seat. The Free Trade Party was defending two seats. Free Trade Senators Albert Gould, Edward Millen and James Walker were not up for re-election.

Queensland
Three seats were up for election. The Protectionist Party was defending one seat. The Free Trade Party was defending one seat. The Labour Party was defending one seat. Protectionist Senator James Drake and Labour Senators Anderson Dawson and William Higgs were not up for re-election.

South Australia
Three seats were up for election. The Protectionist Party was defending one seat. The Free Trade Party was defending one seat. The Labour Party was defending one seat. Protectionist Senator Thomas Playford and Free Trade Senators Sir Richard Baker and Sir Josiah Symon were not up for re-election.

Tasmania
Three seats were up for election. The Protectionist Party was defending one seat. The Free Trade Party was defending two seats. Protectionist Senator John Keating, Free Trade Senator John Clemons and Labour Senator David O'Keefe were not up for re-election.

Victoria
Four seats were up for election, one of which was for the short-term vacancy caused by Free Trade Senator Sir Frederick Sargood's death which had been filled in the interim by Free Trader Robert Reid. The Protectionist Party was defending two seats. The Free Trade Party was defending one seat. The Labour Party was defending one seat, although Senator John Barrett had been denied Labour endorsement and instead ran on the Protectionist ticket. Protectionist Senators Simon Fraser and Sir William Zeal were not up for re-election.

Western Australia

Three seats were up for election. The Free Trade Party was defending two seats. The Labor Party was defending one seat. Free Trade Senators Alexander Matheson and Staniforth Smith and Labour Senator George Pearce were not up for re-election.

References
Adam Carr's Election Archive - House of Representatives 1903
Adam Carr's Election Archive - Senate 1903

See also
 1903 Australian federal election
 Members of the Australian House of Representatives, 1901–1903
 Members of the Australian House of Representatives, 1903–1906
 Members of the Australian Senate, 1901–1903
 Members of the Australian Senate, 1904–1906
 List of political parties in Australia

1903 in Australia
Candidates for Australian federal elections